Eucosmophora trimetalla is a moth of the family Gracillariidae. It is known from Guyana.

The length of the forewings is 3.7 mm for males and females.

References

Acrocercopinae
Moths described in 1915